A list of films produced in Italy in 2005 (see 2005 in film):

External links
Italian films of 2005 at the Internet Movie Database

2005
Films
Italian